Exclusive Records was a record label established by Leon René, which existed from 1944 to 1950.

History
Exclusive Records was established by Leon René in Los Angeles in 1944 and ceased operations in January 1950. Buddy Baker was the music director. The label's roster included music by Lucky Thompson, the Basin Street Boys, the Ceele Burke Orchestra, Edgar Hayes & His Stardusters, Herb Jeffries, Rickey Jordan, Jack McVea & His Orchestra, Mabel Scott, Frantic Fay Thomas, Joe Liggins & His Honeydrippers, and Johnny Moore's Three Blazers with Charles Brown.

Leon René and his brother Otis René, who owned Excelsior Records, purchased a shellac record pressing plant, but when the format changed from 78 rpm to 45 rpm, their old equipment could not press the new smaller vinyl discs, and both labels went out of business.

In 1951, Leon René started up Class Records with his son, musician Googie René. They formed Rendezvous Records with new partners in 1958.

Roster
 Big Jay McNeely
 Buddy Baker Orchestra
 Ceele Burke Orchestra
 Charles Lind
 Dan Burley & His Skiffle Boys
 Doye O'Dell
 Edgar Hayes & His Stardusters
 Ernie Andrews
 Four Hits and a Miss
 Frances Wayne
 Frank Haywood
 "Frantic" Fay Thomas
 Gladys Watts
 Herb Jeffries
 Jack McVea & His Orchestra
 Jimmie Hudson
 Joe Liggins & His Honeydrippers
 Joe Swift (with Johnny Otis & His Orchestra)
 Johnny Moore's Three Blazers
 Les Robinson Orchestra
 Mabel Scott
 Paul Martin Orchestra
 Pete Peterson Orchestra
 Prince Cooper Trio
 Rafael Méndez Orchestra
 Red Callender Trio
 Redd Harper
 Rickey Jordan
 Smokey Hogg
 Steve Miller's Four Barons
 Texas Jim Lewis & His Lone Star Cowboys
 The Basin Street Boys
 The Dixieaires
 The Famous Ward Singers of Philadelphia
 The Gay Sisters of Chicago
 The Sallie Martin Singers
 WMA Soul Stirrers of Houston

References

External links
Exclusive Records on the Internet Archive's Great 78 Project

American record labels
Jazz record labels